PRSSA may refer to:
 President of the Royal Scottish Society of Arts
Public Relations Student Society of America
Puerto Rico Statehood Students Association